The 2022 Wexford Senior Hurling Championship was the 112th staging of the Wexford Senior Hurling Championship since its establishment by the Wexford County Board in 1889. The championship ran from 28 June to 14 August 2022.

Rapparees entered the championship as the defending champions, however, they were beaten by Ferns St Aidan's in the semi-finals. Oylegate–Glenbrien joined the championship after gaining promotion from the intermediate grade.

The final was played on 14 August 2022 at Chadwick's Wexford Park, between Ferns St Aidan's and St Martin's, in what was their first ever meeting in the final. Ferns St Aidan's won the match by 1-20 to 0-22 to claim their first ever championship title.  

Ian Byrne was the championship's top scorer with 4-68.

Team changes

To Championship

Promoted from the Wexford Intermediate Hurling Championship
 Oylegate–Glenbrien

From Championship

Relegated to the Wexford Intermediate Hurling Championship
 Oulart–The Ballagh
 Fethard St Mogue's

Fixtures and results

Group 1

Group 1 table

Group 1 fixtures and results

Group 2

Group 2 table

Group 2 fixtures and results

Knockout stage

Relegation playoff

Quarter-finals

Semi-finals

Final

Championship statistics

Top scorers

Overall

In a single game

Miscellaneous

Ferns St Aidan's win their first ever senior title.

References

Wexford Senior Hurling Championship
Wexford Senior Hurling Championship
Wexford Senior Hurling Championship